The Talleys were a southern gospel trio composed of Roger and Debra Talley, and their daughter Lauren Talley as the lead and soprano singer.  Performing over 20 years, they have made appearances all over the world. At the end of 2020 Roger and Debra retired as singers and Lauren began singing full time as a soloist at the start of 2021.

Group history 
In the 1970s, Roger and Kirk got their start with the Hoppers. Debra sang with the Songmasters Quartet. Roger and Debra married in 1978. Debra joined Roger and as part of the Hoppers and Kirk went to the Cathedral Quartet. In 1984, Kirk wanted to start a new group with Roger and Debra prompting them to form The Talleys. In 1993, the group disbanded and Kirk started a solo career. But by the mid 1990s, Lauren's interest and talent in singing could not be ignored, prompting her mother and father to join with her in the formation of the Talley Trio in 1996.  The group has received numerous accolades from the GMA Dove Awards, Singing News Fan Awards, the Southern Gospel Music Guild Harmony Honors, the BMI Awards and SGN Music Awards.

On June 25, 2011, the Talley Trio changed its name (back) to the Talleys.

On November 20, 2019, The Talleys announced that 2020 would be their final year of touring.

Members

Discography

Compilations
2001: Southern Gospel Treasury
2005: Anthology
2014: The Best Of The Talleys Vol. 1 & 2
2017: God Is Able

Solo albums
Roger Talley (instrumental):
1988: The Legacy
Debra Talley:
1997: Road Home 
2003: Seasons of the Heart
Lauren Talley:
2001: Lauren Talley
2003: Surrender
2005: I Live
2010: Songs in the Night
2017: The Gospel

Video
2001: Sunday in the Smokies
2001: Testament
2001: Talley Reunion Live After Eight Years
2002: At Home With the Talley Trio
2004: Live Across America
2005: Praise For The Ages
2007: Red Letter Day
2008: Bright Lights, Big Stage
2010: He's Alive
1 Singles
-  Searchin'
-  The Healer
-  The Answer is Christ
-  I Love the Lord / Total Praise
-  His Life For Mine
-  Jesus Saves
-  The Debt
-  The Broken Ones
-  That's Enough
-  Life Goes On
-  Up Above

Top 10 Singles
-  Testify
-  I Am What I Am
-  I Love The Cross
-  I'm Happy With You Lord
-  Mountain Mover
-  Orphans of God
-  Red Letter Day
-  My Hope is in the Lord
-  He's Alive
-  The Promise
-  Applause
-  Hands of Grace 
-  Who Will Pray
-  Broken World
-  When He Calls, I'll Fly Away
-  Hidden Heroes
-  What You Leave Behind
-  The People In the Line
-  After All This Time
-  There Is Coming A Day
-  Look Up
-  Grab Your Umbrella
-  When Death Was Arrested

References 

Southern gospel performers
American gospel musical groups